The Collected Stories of Frank Herbert is the sixth, and first posthumous, anthology of short science fiction stories by American author Frank Herbert, released by Tor Books on November 18, 2014.

Stories

External links
DuneNovels.com ~ Official site of Dune and Herbert Limited Partnership

2014 short story collections
Short story collections by Frank Herbert
Tor Books books